Armando Queirós Manuel (l; born 10 November 1966) is a former footballer who played as a midfielder.  Born in Angola, he was a Macau international.

Career

In 2010, he signed for Macau top flight side FC Porto after training with Belenenses in the Portuguese top flight. In 2013, Mandinho signed for  Macau second tier club Sporting de Macau, helping them earn promotion to the Macau top flight. On 16 February 2013, he fell unconscious during a 2–0 win over Alfândega.

References

External links
 

1966 births
Angola international footballers
Angolan expatriate footballers
Angolan footballers
Association football midfielders
Expatriate footballers in Macau
Living people
Macau footballers
Macau international footballers
C.D. Primeiro de Agosto players